Alec Bathgate is a New Zealand musician who was a key member of The Enemy and Toy Love, as well as being one half of the Flying Nun Records act Tall Dwarfs, alongside Chris Knox. In addition to playing guitar in these bands, he also released three solo albums.

Solo discography

Albums

Awards

Aotearoa Music Awards
The Aotearoa Music Awards (previously known as New Zealand Music Awards (NZMA)) are an annual awards night celebrating excellence in New Zealand music and have been presented annually since 1965.

! 
|-
| 1995 || Alec Bathgate for 3 EPs by Tall Dwarfs || Album Cover of the Year||   ||rowspan="2"| 
|-
| 1996 || Alec Bathgate for Abbasalutely || Album Cover of the Year|| 
|-
| 2012 || Alec Bathgate (as part of Toy Love) || New Zealand Music Hall of Fame ||  || 
|-

Notes

External links
 Lil' Chief Records: Alec Bathgate
 Flying Nun Records
 Lil' Chief Records

Flying Nun Records artists
Dunedin Sound musicians
Living people
Lil' Chief Records artists
Musicians from Dunedin
Year of birth missing (living people)